Domenico Giuffrida (born 3 March 1954) is an Italian wrestler. He competed in the men's Greco-Roman 62 kg at the 1976 Summer Olympics.

References

External links
 

1954 births
Living people
Italian male sport wrestlers
Olympic wrestlers of Italy
Wrestlers at the 1976 Summer Olympics
Sportspeople from Catania